Brigadier Michael Donald Keen Dauncey, DSO, DL (9 May 1920 – 23 August 2017) was a British Army officer who participated in Operation Market Garden during the Second World War.

Military career
Michael Donald Keen Dauncy was born in Coventry in the West Midlands on 11 May 1920, the only son of Thomas Gough Dauncey and his wife, Alice Keen. He was educated at King Edward's School, Birmingham.

Market Garden
On the first day of the operation, 17 September 1944, Dauncey flew a Horsa glider into Arnhem. Several days of fighting ensued, during which he sustained eye injuries. Despite being blinded in one eye, he fought on, but was taken prisoner. With another officer he escaped from a Dutch hospital on a rope of knotted sheets and hid in the Utrecht English Parsonage for four months. He was later awarded the Distinguished Service Order for bravery shown during this battle.

Later life
After a number of appointments he was made Colonel of the Cheshire Regiment in 1978.

In retirement he lived in Uley, Gloucestershire, with his wife Marjorie (née Neep). He died on 23 August 2017 aged 97.

References

External links
1st British Airborne Division officers

1920 births
2017 deaths
Companions of the Distinguished Service Order
Deputy Lieutenants of Gloucestershire
People from Uley
Cheshire Regiment officers
Glider Pilot Regiment officers
Operation Market Garden
Escapees from German detention
British military attachés
British Army personnel of World War II
British escapees
Graduates of Joint Services Command and Staff College
Academics of the Royal Military Academy Sandhurst
British Army brigadiers
People educated at King Edward's School, Birmingham
People from Coventry
Cheshire Regiment soldiers
Graduates of the Staff College, Camberley
Military personnel from Warwickshire